Cyperus subfuscus is a species of sedge that is native to northern and central parts of China.

See also 
 List of Cyperus species

References 

subfuscus
Plants described in 1877
Flora of China